North Township is a township in Dade County, in the U.S. state of Missouri.

North Township lies in the northern part of Dade County, hence the name.

References

Townships in Missouri
Townships in Dade County, Missouri